The Ödkarspitzen are three peaks in the Karwendel mountains in the Austrian state of Tyrol in the Hinterautal-Vomper Chain between the ultra-prominent mountain of Birkkarspitze in the east and the Marxenkarspitze in the west.

A waymarked and, in places, protected mountain path, that requires sure-footedness and a head for heights, leads to the summit. The Karwendelhaus may be used in summer as the base for an ascent. The usual route is via the cirque of Schlauchkar and the saddle of the same name. The crossing of all three summits is popular, the Brendelsteig path west of the Western Ödkarspitze being used as an alternative route to return to the Karwendelhaus.

Literature 
 

Two-thousanders of Austria
Mountains of the Alps
Mountains of Tyrol (state)
Karwendel